Perfectly Clear is the seventh studio album recorded by American singer Jewel. Her first album of country music, it was released on Valory Records (an imprint of Big Machine Records) on June 3, 2008 (see 2008 in country music).

Album description
The album is composed of a mixture of new and old fan-favorite songs, although only one of the songs had previously appeared on one of her albums. "2 Become 1", from 0304 appeared in a new country version that was re-titled, "Two Become One". Its lead single, "Stronger Woman", peaked at #13 on the Billboard Hot Country Songs chart.  John Rich, one half of the country rock duo Big & Rich, produced the album.

"I Do", was released to country radio on June 23, 2008 as the album's second single, which peaked in the Top 40. "Till It Feels Like Cheating" was released on October 27, 2008 as the third single, but only stayed on the charts for one week debuting and peaking at #57. Perfectly Clear debuted at #8 on the Billboard 200 with 48,000 copies. The album was released in Australia on May 29, 2009. It was released across Europe in June 2009. The European edition also includes the video for the first single "Stronger Woman". As of June 2010, the album has sold 370,000 copies worldwide, including 240,000 in the U.S.

Critical reception
The album received generally favorable reviews. Rolling Stone magazine gave a mixed review, giving the album 2.5 stars out of 5. The reviewer said that "Jewel doesn't call upon the gritty storytelling of a real Nashville star […] the album is overcrowded by placid soft-rock tunes like "Two Become One" and "Anyone But You" with schmaltzy choruses and flavorless piano-laden verses." Allmusic gave a mixed review too, giving the album 3 stars out of 5. The reviewer also criticized Rich's production and the "poppy, simple songs about relationships […] but it does mean it feels more like the Jewel that everybody came to love back in 1995[.]"

A positive review came from Entertainment Weekly, which received the album well, calling Jewel an "earnest storyteller", and Billboard magazine, which said that the album "is not only persuasive, but down-home, old-school country." The New York Times gave the album an ambivalent review, saying that Jewel's voice was "sharp [and] assured" but criticizing the production.

Track listing

Personnel
 Steve Brewster - drums
 Mike Brignardello - bass guitar
 Eric Darken - percussion
 Jason Freese - mellotron, Hammond organ, synthesizer strings, Wurlitzer
 Wes Hightower - background vocals
 Jewel - acoustic guitar, lead vocals, background vocals
 Mike Johnson - pedal steel guitar
 Liana Manis - background vocals
 Ethan Pilzer - bass guitar
 John Rich - background vocals
 Mike Rojas - accordion, Hammond organ, piano, Wurlitzer
 Adam Shoenfeld - electric guitar
 Glenn Worf - bass guitar
 Jonathan Yudkin - banjo, bouzouki, dulcimer, fiddle, mandolin, viola

Charts

Weekly charts

Year-end charts

Singles

Release history

References

2008 albums
Big Machine Records albums
Jewel (singer) albums
Albums produced by John Rich